Christopher Hawkins may refer to:

 Sir Christopher Hawkins, 1st Baronet (1758–1829), Cornish landowner, mine-owner and Tory Member of Parliament
 Christopher Hawkins (cricketer) (born 1938), former English cricketer
 Christopher Hawkins (dancer), English ballroom dancer and teacher
 Christopher Hawkins (MP for High Peak) (born 1937), Economist and British Conservative Party Member of Parliament for High Peak

See also
Chris Hawkins (born 1975), presenter
Chris Hawkins (American football) (born 1986), American football cornerback